Pico El León is a mountain in the Andes of Venezuela. It has a height of 4740 metres.

See also

List of mountains in the Andes

Mountains of Venezuela
Sierra Nevada National Park (Venezuela)